Dadeville is a city in and the county seat of Tallapoosa County, Alabama, United States. At the 2010 census the population was 3,230, up from 3,212 in 2000.

History
Dadeville was named for Major Francis Langhorne Dade, who died in the Seminole War in Florida in 1835. The town was granted a charter in 1837 and was first incorporated in 1858. It lost its charter during the Civil War, and was incorporated a second time in 1878. Dadeville has been the Tallapoosa County seat since 1838.

Dadeville was home to the Graefenberg Medical Institute, Alabama's first medical school, which operated from 1852 until the outbreak of the Civil War. Attempts to revive the school after the war failed, and the building burned in 1873.

Completion of the Thomas Wesley Martin Dam on the Tallapoosa River in 1926 and the subsequent creation of Lake Martin had and continues to have a strong economic impact on Dadeville.

Wickles Pickles is based in Dadeville.

Geography
Dadeville is located at  (32.832059, -85.764288).

The city is located in the east central part of the state along U.S. Route 280, which runs through the northern part of the city. It leads northwest  to Alexander City and southeast  to Opelika. Alabama State Route 49 also runs through the city from north to south, leading north  to New Site and south  to Reeltown.

Climate
The climate in this area is characterized by hot, humid summers and generally mild to cool winters. According to the Köppen Climate Classification system, Dadeville has a humid subtropical climate, abbreviated "Cfa" on climate maps.

Demographics

2000 census
At the 2000 census there were 3,212 people, 1,122 households, and 813 families living in the city. The racial makeup of the city was 53.24% White, 45.08% Black or African American, 0.25% Native American, 0.28% Asian, 0.37% from other races, and 0.78% from two or more races. 0.81% of the population were Hispanic or Latino of any race.
Of the 1,122 households 34.9% had children under the age of 18 living with them, 45.2% were married couples living together, 22.9% had a female householder with no husband present, and 27.5% were non-families. 24.8% of households were one person and 10.5% were one person aged 65 or older. The average household size was 2.57 and the average family size was 3.05.

The age distribution was 25.4% under the age of 18, 8.7% from 18 to 24, 26.7% from 25 to 44, 20.5% from 45 to 64, and 18.7% 65 or older. The median age was 38 years. For every 100 females, there were 85.3 males. For every 100 females age 18 and over, there were 81.0 males.

The median household income was $25,266 and the median family income was $31,512. Males had a median income of $24,500 versus $20,781 for females. The per capita income for the city was $14,178. About 18.1% of families and 19.3% of the population were below the poverty line, including 25.6% of those under age 18 and 21.7% of those age 65 or over.

2010 census
At the 2010 census there were 3,230 people, 1,217 households, and 807 families living in the city. The racial makeup of the city was 50.2% White, 47.5% Black or African American, 0.3% Native American, 0.6% Asian, 0.3% from other races, and 1.1% from two or more races. 0.9% of the population were Hispanic or Latino of any race.
Of the 1,217 households 27.6% had children under the age of 18 living with them, 38.5% were married couples living together, 23.3% had a female householder with no husband present, and 33.7% were non-families. 30.6% of households were one person and 13.2% were one person aged 65 or older. The average household size was 2.45 and the average family size was 3.05.

The age distribution was 22.9% under the age of 18, 9.6% from 18 to 24, 23.9% from 25 to 44, 27.0% from 45 to 64, and 16.6% 65 or older. The median age was 39.9 years. For every 100 females, there were 88.4 males. For every 100 females age 18 and over, there were 94.5 males.

The median household income was $35,319 and the median family income was $38,824. Males had a median income of $32,031 versus $24,965 for females. The per capita income for the city was $15,923. About 16.9% of families and 19.4% of the population were below the poverty line, including 27.9% of those under age 18 and 15.2% of those age 65 or over.

2020 census

As of the 2020 United States census, there were 3,084 people, 1,044 households, and 677 families residing in the city.

Government and infrastructure
In 2015 members of the city council proposed an ordinance banning sagging shorts, and later proposed one banning miniskirts and short shorts.

Notable people

 Mark Barnes, prominent New York attorney
 Robert E. Burke, U.S. Representative from Texas from 1897 to 1901
 Charles Allen Culberson, 21st Governor of Texas; U.S. Senator from Texas.
 Thomas W. Herren, Lieutenant General, U.S. Army, World War II and Korean War.
 Johnson J. Hooper, author. Hooper lived in Dadeville while serving as circuit solicitor in the courts in Dadeville. Here he made many of his notes for his stories. Dadeville is home to "Simon Suggs", a fictional character immortalized by Hooper's book Adventures of Simon Suggs and the Tallapoosa Volunteers and Other Stories.
 Andrew R. Johnson (1856–1933), Louisiana state senator from 1916 to 1924 and mayor of Homer in the 1910s, was born in Dadeville.
 J. Frank Norris, fundamentalist pastor in Texas. Norris was born in Dadeville in 1877, but moved to Hill County, Texas in the late 1880s.
 Lilius Bratton Rainey, U.S. Representative from Alabama from 1919 to 1923
 Olive Stone, sociologist
 Hoyt Winslett, former collegiate football player

References

Cities in Alabama
Cities in Tallapoosa County, Alabama
County seats in Alabama
Alexander City micropolitan area